Mardiros Tchaparian, commonly known as Mardik, is a Lebanese former footballer who played as a striker.

Active during the 1950s and 1960s, he used to play as a striker for Homenmen at club level. He was the top scorer in the 1960–61 Lebanese Premier League, scoring 15 goals during the season. Mardik also represented the Lebanon national team, scoring a hat-trick in the 1963 Arab Cup.

International career 
On 29 February 1956, Mardik scored against Hungary after an individual effort; Lebanon lost 4–1. Hungarian forward Ferenc Puskás congratulated Mardik, and stated that he has the technique to be able to play in Europe. Following the incident, the Lebanese press nicknamed Mardik "the Lebanese Puskás".

Career statistics

International

Honours 
Homenmen
 Lebanese Premier League: 1954, 1957, 1961

Lebanon
 Pan Arab Games third place: 1957
 Arab Cup third place: 1963

Individual
 Lebanese Premier League top goalscorer: 1960–61

References

External links
 

Year of birth missing
Possibly living people
Place of birth missing
Lebanese footballers
Ethnic Armenian sportspeople
Lebanese people of Armenian descent
Association football forwards
Homenmen Beirut players
Lebanese Premier League players
Lebanon international footballers
Lebanese Premier League top scorers